Gürdere is a village in the Yüksekova District of Hakkâri Province in Turkey. The village is populated by Kurds of the Doski tribe and had a population of 342 in 2022.

The hamlet of Mezran is attached to the village.

Population 
Population history from 2007 to 2022:

References 

Villages in Yüksekova District
Kurdish settlements in Hakkâri Province